The Canadian–American League, nicknamed the Can-Am League, was a class C level minor league baseball circuit which ran from 1936 through 1951, with a three-year break during World War II.

Teams 
Amsterdam Rugmakers, 1938–1942, 1946–1951 (Amsterdam, New York)
Auburn Bouleys, 1938; Auburn Colts, 1940 (Auburn, New York)
Brockville Pirates, 1936; Brockville Blues, 1937 (Brockville, Ontario)
Cornwall Bisons, 1938; Cornwall Maple Leafs, 1939 (Cornwall, Ontario)
Gloversville Glovers, 1937; Gloversville-Johnstown Glovers, 1938–1942, 1946–1951 (Johnstown, New York)
Kingston Colonials, 1951 (Kingston, New York)
Massena Grays, 1936
Ogdensburg Colts, 1936–1939
Oneonta Indians, 1940–1942; Oneonta Red Sox, 1946–1951
Oswego Netherlands, 1936–1940
Ottawa Senators, 1936, 1939; Ottawa Braves, 1937–1938; Ottawa-Ogdensburg Senators, 1940 (Ottawa)
Perth Blue Cats, 1936; Perth-Cornwall Bisons, 1937 (Perth, Ontario)
Pittsfield Electrics, 1941–1942, 1946–1948; Pittsfield Indians, 1949–1950; Pittsfield Phillies, 1951 (Wahconah Park)
Quebec Athletics, 1941–1942; Quebec Alouettes, 1946–1948; Quebec Braves, 1949–1950
Rome Colonels, 1937–1942, 1946–1951
Schenectady Blue Jays, 1946–1950 (Schenectady, New York)
Smiths Falls Beavers, 1937 (Smiths Falls, Ontario)
Trois Rivieres Renards, 1941–1942; Trois Rivieres Royals, 1946-1950
Utica Braves, 1939–1942
Watertown Grays, 1936

League Champions
1936 Perth Blue Cats/Royals
1937 Ogdensburg Colts
1938 Cornwall Bisons
1939 Rome Colonels
1940 Amsterdam Rugmakers
1941 Oneonta Indians
1942 Ogdensburg Colts
1946 Trois-Rivières Royals
1947 Schenectady Blue Jays
1948 Oneonta Red Sox
1949 Quebec Braves
1950 Quebec Braves
1951 Oneonta Red Sox

Further reading
David Pietrusza: Baseball's Canadian-American League, McFarland, Jefferson, NC, 2005 (original printing 1990).

Defunct baseball leagues in Canada
Defunct minor baseball leagues in the United States
1936 establishments in the United States
1951 disestablishments in the United States
Sports leagues established in 1936
Sports leagues disestablished in 1951